In enzymology, a methylated-DNA-[protein]-cysteine S-methyltransferase is an enzyme that catalyzes the chemical reaction

DNA (containing 6-O-methylguanine) + protein L-cysteine  DNA (without 6-O-methylguanine) + protein S-methyl-L-cysteine

Thus, the two substrates of this enzyme are DNA containing 6-O-methylguanine and protein L-cysteine, whereas its two products are DNA and protein S-methyl-L-cysteine.  The S-methyl-L-cysteine residue irreversibly inactivates the protein, allowing only one transfer for each protein.

This enzyme belongs to the family of transferases, specifically those transferring one-carbon group methyltransferases.  The systematic name of this enzyme class is DNA-6-O-methylguanine:[protein]-L-cysteine S-methyltransferase.

Structural studies

References

 
 
 

EC 2.1.1
Enzymes of known structure